Sabbath School is a function of the Seventh-day Adventist Church, Seventh Day Baptist, Church of God (Seventh-Day), some other sabbatarian denominations, usually comprising a song service and Bible study lesson on the Sabbath. It is usually held before the church service on Saturday morning, but this may vary.

It includes programs that are Bible based, to foster Christian growth. This period usually lasts for a period of 1 hour 40 minutes. During this time the "lesson study" is also conducted.

Activities
Sabbath School usually begins at 9:30am or 10:30am on Saturday mornings before the worship service starts.  The Sabbath School service for adults typically has two portions.  The first portion begins with a song service, followed by a mission emphasis and a short talk.  The second, and larger portion, is the lesson study.  Different churches conduct Sabbath School in many ways, mostly teaching on the same topic or reading in a given week, as each quarter of the year has a different theme that reflects Bible, doctrinal, or church lifestyle teachings. The lesson booklet is called the "quarterly."

Sabbath School may be conducted in one large class, or the congregation may separate into smaller groups for discussion in the sanctuary or in different rooms. Participation is not restricted to Church members. Young people often meet separately. After Sabbath School the church service begins, usually at 11:00am.

On the last Sabbath of the quarter, or the 13th Sabbath, a special collection is taken for a missionary project. During the "13th Sabbath Program," youngsters may present a music or acting special based on the subject learned that quarter or explain the traditions and dress in the attire of the countries or world regions which offerings collected will benefit. Communion Service preceded by footwashing may take place on or right after the 13th Sabbath.

A 2002 worldwide survey of local church leaders estimated that 67% of Adventists, including 63% of under-18s, "attend Sabbath School nearly every week".

Teachers
Sabbath School teachers are usually lay people selected by a designated coordinator, board, or committee.  Normally, the selection is based on a perception of character and ability to teach the Bible rather than formal training in education, although some Sabbath School teachers have a background in education as a result of their occupation.  Some churches offer courses in teaching, or hold teachers' classes to go over the lesson for that Sabbath; other churches allow volunteers who make a profession of faith to teach without training.

Study guides (Seventh-day Adventist)

Adult lesson

Adult church members are provided with the Adult Bible Study Guide (formerly known as Sabbath School Quarterly) issued four times a year. It is also known as the "Quarterly" and the "Lesson". It is published by Pacific Press Publishing Association.  Sabbath School quarterlies are Bible study guides that cover a specific topic or book of the Bible every quarter.  The quarterly is designed to be read during the week, so that during Sabbath School, the class members are ready to discuss questions and topics raised in that lesson in small groups.  The Adult Sabbath School always has a heavy focus on the Bible.  All Seventh-day Adventists around the world use the same Sabbath School quarterly, translated into the necessary languages (with few exceptions such as Germany, where members cover the same topic with different material).  the editor of the Adult Sabbath School lessons was Clifford Goldstein.

Other lessons
At the same time as the adult study, children attend classes for their age group.  Typical age group divisions are Beginner (infants), Kindergarten (K), Primary (Grades 1-3), Junior (Grades 4-6), Earliteen (Grades 7-8), Youth (High School), and Collegiate (College and Young Adult).  Each age division has its own specific quarterly, which is titled by the class name up to Primary.  Juniors and Earliteens often share the same quarterly entitled PowerPoints.  Some Earliteen groups use a separate publication entitled Real Time Faith.  Youth use either Cornerstone Connections or Collegiate Quarterly (CQ).  Some churches give the children a weekly magazine at the close of Sabbath School.  Kindergarten receives Our Little Friend, Primary receives Primary Treasure, Juniors and Earliteens receive Guide, and the Youth receive Insight.

See also
 Sabbath Schools is also the name given to secret, self-run schools run by and for slaves wanting to be literate. The Reverend Elijah Green in his autobiography tells of attending one in the 1830's, always afraid to be discovered by white patroller who would break up the school, beating all who taught or attended.
 Seventh-day Adventist worship

References

External links
Adult Bible Study Guide official website

History of the Seventh-day Adventist Church
Sunday schools